Günther Steinhauser was an Italian luger who competed from the mid-1980s to the mid-1990s. A natural track luger, he won two medals in the men's doubles event at the FIL World Luge Natural Track Championships with a gold in 1994 and a bronze in 1986.

Steinhauser also won three medals in the men's doubles event at the FIL European Luge Natural Track Championships with two gold (1983, 1989) and one bronze (1987).

References
Natural track European Championships results 1970-2006.
Natural track World Championships results: 1979-2007

Italian lugers
Italian male lugers
Living people
Year of birth missing (living people)
Sportspeople from Südtirol